Chernihivka is an urban-type settlement in Berdiansk Raion of Zaporizhzhia Oblast (region) of Ukraine. Prior to 2020, it was also the administrative center of the former Chernihivka Raion.

Chernihivka is situated midway between the cities of  Zaporizhzhia and Berdyansk on the bank of Tokmak River in the geographic territory known as Azov Upland. The town is located in the middle of the Pontic steppe away from major highways and railways.

Chernihivka is a populated place of Chernihivka settlement council, which is a municipal community and beside the town also includes two rural settlements and four neighboring villages.

Chernihivka was founded in 1783 by villagers from Chernigov Governorate (Chernihiv Governorate) who lived on territory of the today's Romny Raion (Sumy Oblast).

The agrarian company Zorya (meaning Star) plays an important role in the region. During the Soviet times the company was called Zarya Kommunizma (the Dawn of Communism).

People from Chernihivka 
 Volodymyr Horilyi (born 1965), Soviet and Ukrainian footballer

References

Urban-type settlements in Berdiansk Raion
Berdiansk Raion
Berdyansky Uyezd